Léon Paul Gabriel Mougeot (10 November 1857 – 25 October 1928) was a French politician who was under-secretary of state for Posts and Telegraphs from  1898 to 1902, and Minister of Agriculture from 1902 to 1905. He was responsible for introducing cast-iron "mougeottes", letter boxes that displayed the day and last pick-up made, and for subsidizing the use of bicycles by postmen.

Early career

Léon Paul Gabriel Mougeot was born on 10 November 1857 in Montigny-le-Roy, Haute-Marne, son of  a notary.
He attended the lycées of Chaumont and Nancy for his secondary education, then studied law in Dijon and Paris.
At the age of 24 he became an attorney in Langres.
He gained attention in 1892 for successfully defending a notary accused of abuse of confidence.
In 1893 he was the founding president of the Horticulture and Wine growing Society of Haute-Marne.
He and Édouard Dessein (1875–1961) co-founded several agricultural mutual funds.
Mougeot was an active Freemason and belonged to the Chaumont lodge L'Étoile de la Haute-Marne.

Mougeot was elected to the Langres municipal council in 1884, and was mayor from 1888 to 1898.
In 1898 he became a member of the general council of the department of Haute-Marne, and was president of the departmental assembly from 1907 to 1920.
He was one of the leaders of the Radical Party in Haute-Marne and dominated local politics, particularly during the phylloxera crisis, when he defended the winemakers and distillers.
He ran for election as a deputy in 1889 but was defeated.
In 1893 Mougeot was elected deputy for Haute-Marne.
At first he sat with the Progressive Left, of which he was secretary, then moved further left.
He was secretary of the chamber from 1896 to 1898.

Posts and telephones

Mougeot was under-secretary of state for Posts and Telegraphs from  5 July 1898 to 7 June 1902 in the cabinets of Henri Brisson, Charles Dupuy and Pierre Waldeck-Rousseau.
On 18 May 1899 there was a strike of postmen in Paris due to the Senate having refused to agree with a decision by the deputies to pay Parisian postmen higher rates than their rural colleagues. Rather than agree to a general pay increase, the Senators refused any pay increase at all. Mougeot arranged to requisition several hundred soldiers and national guards to distribute the mail in Paris, which caused the strike to be cancelled immediately.

When Mougeot took office most letter boxes were of wood reinforced with iron, and dated to 1830.
On 31 July 1899 Mougeot signed a decree to place a new type of cast-iron letter box into general usage, made by Delachanal of Paris. Nicknamed "mougeottes", they had three small windows that let the users see the day, the planned number of pick-ups and the last pick-up that had been made.
Two variants were made, one wall-mounted and the other on an iron column fixed to the sidewalk.
The "mougeottes" were introduced experimentally at first, but proved very popular and were soon installed throughout France.
At first bronze-green in color, from 1905 they were painted blue.

In October 1899 Mougeot experimented in the 12th arrondissement of Paris with couriers using automobiles, but this did not catch on. 
Mougeot installed the first stamp machines, and postcards delivered by compressed air in Paris.
He also supported the use of bicycles by postmen, a long-planned but always delayed innovation.
In 1898 he decided to build a "telephone office" in Langres, which came into service on 27 March 1900.

Later career

Mougeot was Minister of Agriculture in the cabinet of Émile Combes from  7 June 1902 to 24 January 1905, and was firmly protectionist.
He did not make any notable improvements.
He did contribute to the protectionist law on adulteration of wine of 1905, which survived until 1993. Although adulterated alcohol could be dangerous to health, Mougeot said the law was solely to prevent fraud, since this was the only concern of the Ministry of Agriculture.
In March–November 1907 Mougeot was political director of Le Petit Troyen, a regional journal.
In August 1908 Mougeot was elected to the Senate and resigned his parliamentary seat.
He sat with the Democratic Left in the Senate.

Mougeot acquired valuable landholdings in the colonies, and in Tunisia was called "le seigneur Mougeot".
In 1913 he was chairman of the Compagnie Occidentale de Madagascar which he had violently opposed when he was a new deputy.
He did not run for re-election in 1920.
Léon Mougeot died on 25 October 1928 in Rochevilliers, Haute-Marne, at the age of 70.

Publications

Notes

Sources

1857 births
1928 deaths
People from Haute-Marne
Politicians from Grand Est
Radical Party (France) politicians
French Ministers of Agriculture
Members of the 6th Chamber of Deputies of the French Third Republic
Members of the 7th Chamber of Deputies of the French Third Republic
Members of the 8th Chamber of Deputies of the French Third Republic
Members of the 9th Chamber of Deputies of the French Third Republic
French Senators of the Third Republic
Senators of Haute-Marne
French Freemasons